Cory J. Boyd (born August 6, 1985) is a former gridiron football running back. He was drafted by the Tampa Bay Buccaneers in the 7th round of the 2008 NFL Draft. He played college football at South Carolina.

Early years
Boyd played high school football and basketball at Orange High School, earning him a football scholarship to the University of South Carolina.

College career
Boyd played for legendary coaches Lou Holtz and Steve Spurrier while at South Carolina. He finished ranked 10th all time in Gamecocks rushing with 2,267 total yards and 9th all time in yards receiving with 
1,283 total yards. Boyd finished with 28 touchdowns in his 4 seasons with the Gamecocks. He played in the 2007 East-West Shrine Game.

Professional career

Tampa Bay Buccaneers
Boyd was drafted by the Tampa Bay Buccaneers in the 7th round (238rd overall) of the 2008 NFL Draft. He injured his knee during a rookie mini-camp and was placed on injured reserve for the 2008 season. Boyd was released by Tampa Bay on October 17, 2008.

Denver Broncos
Boyd was signed to the practice squad of the Denver Broncos on November 4, 2008 after running back P. J. Pope was promoted to the active roster. Boyd was promoted to the active roster on December 9 when fullback Peyton Hillis was placed on injured reserve. The Broncos waived Boyd six days later and re-signed him to the practice squad. He was then put back onto the active roster for Week 17 of the 2008 season following the season-ending injuries to Selvin Young and P.J. Pope.

The Broncos waived Boyd on March 31, 2009.

Toronto Argonauts
Boyd signed as a free agent with the Toronto Argonauts of the Canadian Football League on March 12, 2010 and was extended with Toronto on March 21, 2011. In his  first year in the CFL, he rushed for 1,359 yards and had 363 yards receiving in spite of missing several games due to injuries.  Boyd received several post-season honors including  being named the CFL's toughest player, the Argonauts' most outstanding player and was also nominated to the CFL East All-Star Team. For 2011, Boyd rushed for 1,141 yards and had 118 yards receiving having missed multiple games due to injuries. Once again, Boyd was named a RB for the CFL East All-Star Team.

Boyd was released by the Toronto Argonauts on August 12, 2012. At the time of his release, Boyd led the CFL in rushing.

Edmonton Eskimos
Hours after his release from Toronto, Boyd joined the Edmonton Eskimos. On October 11, 2012, Cory Boyd was released by the Eskimos. Boyd saw limited playing time (76 yards through 8 games) as the Eskimos backfield became very crowded with Hugh Charles and Jerome Messam. He was re-signed on October 21 after an injury to Hugh Charles.

Post retirement
Boyd now coaches football at South Carolina Faith Athletics & Music College in Charleston Sc.

References

External links
Just Sports Stats
Edmonton Eskimos bio
Toronto Argonauts bio
Denver Broncos bio
South Carolina Gamecocks bio
Tampa Bay Buccaneers bio

1985 births
Living people
African-American players of American football
African-American players of Canadian football
American football running backs
Canadian football running backs
Denver Broncos players
Edmonton Elks players
Orange High School (New Jersey) alumni
People from Orange, New Jersey
Players of American football from New Jersey
South Carolina Gamecocks football players
Sportspeople from Essex County, New Jersey
Tampa Bay Buccaneers players
Toronto Argonauts players
21st-century African-American sportspeople
20th-century African-American people